Yeliseyev or Eliseev is a Russian surname, there are two different transliterations. Notable people with the surname include:

Yeliseyev 

 Aleksandr Yeliseyev (born 1991), Russian footballer
 Aleksei Yeliseyev (born 1934), Soviet cosmonaut
 Andrey Yeliseyev (born 1991), Russian footballer
  (born 1959), Soviet and Russian literary and film critic, publicist and translator
 Viktor Yeliseyev (born 1950), Russian general and choirmaster
 Vladislav Yeliseyev (born 1960), Russian-born American fine artist
 Yevhen Yeliseyev (born 1989), Ukrainian footballer
 Yuriy Yeliseyev (born 1949), Soviet footballer

Eliseev 

 Grigory Eliseev (1821–1891), Russian journalist
 Matvey Eliseev (born 1993), Russian biathlete
 Vitali Eliseev (born 1950), Russian rower

See also
 Eliseev

Russian-language surnames